Spyglass may refer to:

 Another term for a hand-held refracting telescope for terrestrial observation
 A monocular, a compact refractor
 "Spy Glass", a recurring sketch on Saturday Night Live
 Spyglass Media Group, entertainment company formerly known as Spyglass Entertainment
 Spyglass Board Games, a collection of board games on Xbox Live Arcade
 Spyglass, Inc., software company
 J. Elmer Spyglass
 Spyglass Hill Golf Course
 Spyglass (album), a mini-album by J-pop singer, Kaori Utatsuki